Joseph Marie Anthony Cordeiro (19 January 1918 – 11 February 1994) was a Catholic prelate who in 1973 became the first Pakistani cardinal.

Early life
Cordeiro was born to a Goan family. He was educated at St Patrick's High School, Karachi, the University of Bombay and Oxford University. He received his religious training at the Papal Seminary in Kandy, Sri Lanka, and was ordained a priest in Karachi, Pakistan on 24 August 1946.

Career

From 1946 to 1948, he did pastoral work in Hyderabad and Karachi.

He then attended Oxford University, where he earned a Master of Arts degree.

In 1950 he was appointed Vice Principal of St Patrick's High School, Karachi. From 1952 he served as principal of St Francis Grammar School in Quetta and as rector of the St. Pius X Minor Seminary in Quetta. On 7 May 1958, he was appointed Archbishop of Karachi, with his seat at Saint Patrick's Cathedral, Karachi.

He attended the Second Vatican Council (1962–1965), the First Ordinary Assembly of the Synod of Bishops, Vatican City (1967), the First Extraordinary Assembly of the Synod of Bishops, Vatican City (1969) and the Second Ordinary Assembly of the Synod of Bishops, Vatican City (1971). He was elected a member of the Council of the General Secretariat of the Synod of Bishops (1971).

He was the first Pakistani cardinal, a position elevated by Pope Paul VI (1973). He attended both papal conclaves in 1978, and was mentioned as papabile by Time Magazine after Pope John Paul I's death.

He wrote a series of articles for the Archdiocesan weekly Christian Voice called "Lessons of a Lifetime", a reflection on his life experiences.

From 1958 until his death, Cordeiro was president of the Catholic Bishops' Conference of Pakistan.

He was also since 1972 the secretary of the Federation of Asian Bishops' Conferences.

Death
Cordeiro died on 11 February 1994 at Holy Family Hospital with complications due to cancer. Cordeiro was succeeded by Archbishop Simeon Anthony Pereira.

Honors
Cordeiro was honoured by the Christ the King Seminary in Karachi that has hosted the Cardinal Cordeiro Cricket tournament to promote religious vocations since 2008.

On 6 May 2011, The Old Patricians (former students of St Patrick's school) presented the Joseph Cardinal Cordeiro Gold Medal to the top student from the Cambridge A level section at the closing ceremony of the 150th anniversary of the school.

In 2012, Cardinal Cordeiro High School was named in his honor. The school is located in the Good Shepherd Parish in Korangi Town, Karachi.

His alma mater, St. Patrick's High School named the Cardinal Cordeiro Silver Jubilee Auditorium in his honor.

References 

1918 births
1994 deaths
Christian clergy from Mumbai

People from Karachi
St. Patrick's High School, Karachi alumni
Participants in the Second Vatican Council
20th-century Roman Catholic archbishops in Pakistan
Pakistani people of Goan descent
Pakistani cardinals
Cardinals created by Pope Paul VI
University of Mumbai alumni
Alumni of the University of Oxford
Pakistani educators
Roman Catholic archbishops of Karachi